Karagöl is a small crater lake in the Taurus Mountains in Turkey.

Geography
It is situated almost on the borderline of Niğde Province and Mersin Province and is accessible from Darboğaz, a town in the Ulukışla district of Niğde Province.

The lake
Due to high altitude, the area around the lake is devoid of trees, although the shore is covered with shrubs and wild flowers. The lake is home to Rana holtzi, an endemic frog (Werner, 1898), which is popularly called the "Frog of Toros" The lake is popular with mountaineers and trekkers.

Around Karagöl
Mountaineers usually begin from Meydan Yaylası.

References

External links
For images
For Toros frog

Lakes of Turkey
Volcanic crater lakes
Landforms of Niğde Province 
Landforms of Mersin Province
Taurus Mountains